Daggett County is a county in the northeastern corner of the U.S. state of Utah. As of the 2020 United States Census, the population was 935, making it the least populous county in Utah. Its county seat is Manila. The county was named for Ellsworth Daggett, the first surveyor-general of Utah. The small community of Dutch John, located near the state line with Colorado and Wyoming, became an incorporated town in January 2016.

History
The journey involved overland travel to a train station in Wyoming, to either Mack, Colorado, Price, or Salt Lake City, then a stagecoach to Vernal. In the fall 1917 election, the Uintah county voters voted to establish a separate county on the northern slope of the Uinta Mountains. The act establishing the county was approved on January 7, 1918, naming Manila as the county seat.

The boundary between Daggett and Uintah counties was adjusted in 1919, with some territory being returned to Uintah. Daggett County boundaries have remained unchanged since 1919.

Geography
Daggett County lies at the lower northeastern corner of Utah. Its northern border abuts the south border of the state of Wyoming, and its eastern boundary abuts the western border of the state of Colorado. Its main geographical features are the Uinta Mountains, which comprise its southwestern portion and delineate part of its southern border, and the Green River, which has carved a deep gorge through the east-central part of the county. In 1958, the United States Bureau of Reclamation took advantage of this natural feature to construct the Flaming Gorge Dam, creating the Flaming Gorge Reservoir, which began filling in 1964.

The county terrain slopes to the north and east on the northern flank of the Uintas. The county's highest point is on a mountain crest along its south border, at 12,276' (3742m) ASL. It is the fourth-smallest county in Utah by area. Over 90% of the land of Daggett County is under federal ownership.

Major highways

 U.S. Route 191
 Utah State Route 43
 Utah State Route 44
 Utah State Route 1364 (Browns Park Rd)

Adjacent counties

 Sweetwater County, Wyoming - north
 Moffat County, Colorado - east
 Uintah County - south
 Duchesne County - southwest
 Summit County - west

Protected areas

 Ashley National Forest (part)
 Browns Park Waterfowl Area
 Browns Park Waterfowl Management Area
 Clay Basin Wildlife Management Area
 Flaming Gorge National Recreation Area (part)
 Goslin Mountain Wildlife Management Area
 Indian Crossing Campground (BLM)
 Marshall Draw Wildlife Management Area
 Taylors Flat Wildlife Management Area

Lakes

 Big Springs
 Browne Lake
 Browns Park National Wildlife Refuge Reservoir
 Chokecherry Spring
 Cow Spring
 Daggett Lake
 Dowds Hole
 Dripping Spring
 East Grindstone Spring
 Fighting Spring
 Flaming Gorge Reservoir (part)
 Ford Spring
 Greens Lakes
 Greens Lake
 West Greens Lake
 Grindstone Spring
 Lamb Lakes
 Bummer Lake
 Ewe Lake
 Lamb Lake
 Mutton Lake
 Ram Lake
 Long Park Reservoir
 Lower Potter Lake
 One Fish Lake
 Pollen Lake
 Potter Lake (Upper Potter Lake)
 Red Lake
 Serviceberry Spring
 Sheep Creek Lake
 Spirit Lake (part)
 Spitzenburg Spring
 Stove Lake
 Tepee Lakes
 Lower Teepee Lake
 Upper Teepee Lake
 Weyman Lakes
 Anson Lake (Lower Anson Lake)
 Candy Lake
 Clear Lake
 Hidden Lake
 Penguin Lake
 Sesame Lake
 Upper Anson Lake
 Youngs Spring

Demographics

2000 census
As of the 2000 United States Census, 1,059 people, 426 households, and 287 families residing in the county. The population density was 1.52 people per square mile (0.59/km2).  There were 1,141 housing units at an average density of 1.64/sqmi (0.63/km2). The racial makeup of the county was 95.94% White, 0.38% Black or African American, 0.76% Native American, 0.38% Asian, 0.09% Pacific Islander, 1.42% from other races, and 1.04% from two or more races. 3.12% of the population were Hispanic or Latino of any race.

There were 426 households, out of which 25.12% had children under the age of 18 living with them, 67.37% were married couples living together, 4.93% had a female householder with no husband present, and 32.63% were non-families. 29.11% of all households were made up of individuals, and 13.62% had someone living alone who was 65 years of age or older.  The average household size was 2.34, and the average family size was 2.91.

The county population contained 23.61% under the age of 20, 3.78% from 20 to 24, 24.93% from 25 to 44, 28.71% from 45 to 64, and 18.98% who were 65 years of age or older. The median age was 42.8 years. For every 100 females, there were 129.22 males. For every 100 females aged 18 and over, there were 135.17 males.

2016
As of 2016, the largest self-reported ancestry groups in Daggett County, Utah, were:
 35.4% were of English ancestry
 9.2% were of Scots-Irish ancestry
 8.8% were of German ancestry
 8.3% were of Irish ancestry
 7.9% were of American ancestry
 7.2% were of Dutch ancestry
 5.5% were of Danish ancestry.
 3.3% were of Swedish ancestry
 2.5% were of Scottish ancestry
 2.1% were of Italian ancestry
 1.6% were of Swiss ancestry
 1.6% were of French ancestry
 1.5% were of Norwegian ancestry
 0.7% were of Polish ancestry

Politics and Government
Daggett County is governed by three commissioners, an auditor/recorder, a clerk/treasurer, an assessor, and a sheriff, all elected for four-year terms in partisan elections. Judges stand for a non-partisan retention election every four years. Current officeholders and the year the current term began:
 Commissioner (Interim): Matt Tippets 2019
 Commission Chairman: Randy Asay 2016
 Commissioner: Jack Lytle (R) 2018
 Auditor/Recorder: Keri Pallesen (R) 2011
 Clerk/Treasurer: Brian Raymond
 Assessor: Lesa Asay (R) 2011
 Sheriff: Eric L. Bailey (R) appointed May 2017
 Justice Court Judge (Manila): Judge Charlene Hartmann (appointed 2007)
 Justice Court Judge (Dutch John): Judge Anne Steen (appointed 2007), The county commission eliminated this position in early 2014.

Daggett County has traditionally voted Republican. In no national election since 1964 has the county selected the Democratic Party candidate (as of 2020).

Commerce and transportation
The few commercial establishments in Daggett County exist to service tourists and users of the Flaming Gorge National Recreation Area. Throughout the county, there is one small general store, several gas stations, five cafes or restaurants, five inns/motels, and a few miscellaneous businesses that offer raft rentals. Some businesses offer guided fishing trips on the Flaming Gorge Reservoir and the Green River. The economy is primarily related to recreation, management of government land, and ranching. There are no railroads within Daggett County.

Communities

Towns
 Dutch John
 Manila (county seat)

Census-designated places
 Flaming Gorge

Former communities
 Bridgeport
Greendale
Linwood

See also

 List of counties in Utah
 National Register of Historic Places listings in Daggett County, Utah
 USS Daggett County (LST-689)

References

External links

 

 
1918 establishments in Utah
Populated places established in 1918